Prunus napaulensis is a species of bird cherry native to the eastern foothills of the Himalayas, including Nepal, Myanmar and China. A tree, it can reach 27m and prefers to grow between 1800 and 3000m above sea level. The fruit is edible, and it is cultivated for its fruit in Assam and Ukhrul District, Manipur. It is called Theikanthei in Tangkhul language (and presumably elsewhere). Its wood is used locally for making furniture. Prunus bracteopadus is a very similar species, possibly conspecific.

Notes

References

External links
 

Bird cherries
napaulensis
Flora of Assam (region)
Flora of East Himalaya
Flora of Myanmar
Flora of Nepal
Flora of South-Central China
Plants described in 1841